Ministry of Finance — one of the Russian Empire's central public institutions, in charge of financial and economic policy.

The ministry was established on 8 September 1802, and reorganized in 1810–11. 
By the end of the 19th century, it consisted of a: 
 Ministerial Council
 General and Special Offices for Crediting
 Department of the State Treasury - controlling the movement of the funds and keeping the account for all the treasuries
 Department of Assessed contributions - for taxes and Zemstvo duties
 Department of Customs Duties
 Department of Railway Affairs
 Department of Unassessed taxes and for State sales of Spirits
 Central Weights and Measures Board
 number of permanent Committees and Councils.

See also 
 List of Finance Ministers of Imperial Russia

Finance
1802 establishments in the Russian Empire
1917 disestablishments in Russia